Michael Hallahan (born 14 March 1949) is a former Australian rules footballer with the Fitzroy Football Club in the Victorian Football League.

Hallahan commenced his footballing career with Wangaratta Rovers Football Club.  For Fitzroy he played 3 games in 1967.

Hallahan's father, Jim Hallahan, Jr., also played with Fitzroy in the 1940s.

References

External links
 
 

1949 births
Fitzroy Football Club players
Wangaratta Rovers Football Club players
Australian rules footballers from Victoria (Australia)
Living people